Hoplophryne is a genus of microhylid frogs. The genus is endemic to mountain forests of Tanzania. They are also known as three-fingered frogs or African banana frogs (not to be confused with Afrixalus, another African genus known as "banana frogs").

Species
There are two species in this genus, both endangered:
 Hoplophryne rogersi Barbour and Loveridge, 1928
 Hoplophryne uluguruensis Barbour and Loveridge, 1928

Description
Hoplophryne are small frogs, reaching  in snout–vent length (female H. rogersi). Their distinctive characters is that male frogs have only three fingers: the thumb is reduced to a small bump or group of spines.

Ecology and reproduction
Hoplophryne can be found in leaf litter, under logs, and in bananas and bamboos. Reproduction takes place in phytotelmata. The modified thumbs of males are probably involved in mating, helping the male to embrace the female.

References

 
Microhylidae
Amphibian genera
Amphibians of Sub-Saharan Africa
Endemic fauna of Tanzania
Taxa named by Thomas Barbour
Taxa named by Arthur Loveridge